Waikumete Cemetery, originally Waikomiti Cemetery, is New Zealand's largest cemetery. It occupies a site of 108 hectares in Glen Eden, Auckland, and also contains a crematorium in the south-west corner of the cemetery.

History
Waikumete Cemetery was established in 1886 and is the final resting place for over 70,000 people. It was established after the Symonds Street Cemetery was surrounded by residential housing, and its location was decided by the proximity of the nearby Glen Eden railway station, as access by railway was desired. Passengers would travel to Waikumete on the same train as their loved ones in special train services held on Sundays. The funeral carriage was separated from passengers, and used a separate platform. The Chapel of Faith in the Oaks was built in 1886 as a mortuary chapel and was used until the larger chapel was built in 1952. The Chapel of Faith in the Oaks were shared between local Methodist, Anglican and Pentecostal communities for church services, until the Methodist and Anglican churches were built in Glen Eden in 1910 and 1926 respectively.

The cemetery was used to bury bodies coming from the city of Auckland during the 1918 flu pandemic. Glen Eden residents themselves were mostly unaffected by the flu. An alarm would sound at the train station when the bodies were brought by train from the city. Most flu victims were buried in the non-denominational section of the cemetery, due to the lack of identifying knowledge about who many of the victims were.

In 1929, a major fire broke out at the cemetery, burning 100 acres of native bush that had been planted in the 19th century. In February 1939, the cemetery was involved in the first case of graverobbing in New Zealand, when two Australian visitors to Auckland, G R Mackey and J A Talbot, dug up the body of a recently buried soldier to use in an insurance scam, burning the body inside a bach at Piha.

Waikumete is home to a number of prominent memorials, including the Mount Erebus disaster memorial, a Holocaust memorial, a New Zealand 1918 flu pandemic memorial and an ANZAC cenotaph.

War graves
Two extensive areas of the cemetery were allocated for the burial of service personnel of the World Wars and post-war veterans. In total, the Commonwealth War Graves Commission register and maintain the graves of 285 Commonwealth service personnel at the cemetery, 110 from World War I and 176 from World War II.

In the entrance to the cemetery the Commission erected the Auckland Provincial Memorial, commemorating the 56 service personnel from the Auckland Province who died serving in and around New Zealand in both World Wars but have no known grave.

The commission also commemorates 44 World War II service personnel who were cremated at Waikumete Crematorium. In 1999, a memorial to seven personnel whose ashes were formerly stored in the chapel building was placed on the site of their final resting place in the chapel lawn.

Burials

Some of the notable people buried at the cemetery include:
 Albert Asher (1879–1965), rugby union and rugby league footballer
 Don Buck (1869/70–1917), also known as Francisco Rodrigues Figueira, gum-digger and businessman
 Barry Butterworth (1939–1993), speedway driver
 Assid Corban (1925–2018), the first Mayor of Waitakere City and winemaker
 James Crichton (1879–1961), recipient of the Victoria Cross
 Angela D'Audney (1944–2002), Television New Zealand news anchor
 Father Felix Donnelly QSM ONZM (1929–2019), priest, broadcaster, Youthline founder
 Cameron Duncan (1986–2003), writer and director, inspiration for Into the West
 Pauly Fuemana (1969–2010), lead singer of OMC
 John Gildroy Grant (1889–1970), recipient of the Victoria Cross
 Richard Henderson MM (1895–1958), decorated stretcher bearer in World War I
 Paul Hewson (1953–1985), songwriter and keyboard player in NZ band Dragon
 Reginald Judson (1881–1972) recipient of the Victoria Cross, Distinguished Conduct Medal and the Military Medal
 Ray Lawless (1909–1968) New Zealand rugby league representative
 Bruce McLaren (1937–1970), race-car designer, driver, engineer and inventor
 Ellen Melville (1882–1946), president of the National Council of Women of New Zealand and Auckland City Councillor
 Horace Neal (1896–1951) New Zealand rugby league representative
 Don Oliver MBE (1937–1996), weightlifter and fitness centre founder
 Tuna Scanlan (1934–2014), boxer
 Ian Scott (1945–2013), artist
 Maurice Shadbolt CBE (1932–2004), writer and playwright
 Samuel Shrimski (1828–1902), politician from Oamaru
 Arthur Singe (1898–1936), rugby union and rugby league footballer

See also
 List of cemeteries in New Zealand

Notes

References

External links

 Waikumete Cemetery Auckland City Council website
 Tales From The Crypt, Matthew Gray's Historical Column on Waikumete Cemetery Graves

Cemeteries in Auckland
Waitākere Ranges Local Board Area
Urban forests in New Zealand
Spanish flu monuments and memorials
1886 establishments in New Zealand
West Auckland, New Zealand